Pilarz may refer to:
Pilarz, Iran, a village in Ardabil Province, Iran
Pilarz (surname)